Illumination Ritual is the eighth full-length album by Lawrence, Kansas-based Indie Rock group the Appleseed Cast, released on April 23, 2013 by  Graveface Records.

Track listing

 "Adriatic to Black Sea" - 5:28
 "Great Lake Derelict" - 4:36
 "Simple Forms" - 2:41
 "Cathedral Rings" - 4:37
 "30 Degrees 3 AM" - 4:15
 "Branches on the Arrow Peak Revelation" - 3:01
 "Barrier Islands (Do We Remain)" - 4:12
 "North Star Ordination" - 6:01
 "Clearing Life" - 5:14
 "Illumination Ritual" - 4:02

References

2013 albums
The Appleseed Cast albums